"Northern Wars" is a term used for a series of wars fought in northern and northeastern Europe from the 16th to the 18th century. An internationally agreed-on nomenclature for these wars has not yet been devised. While the Great Northern War is generally considered to be the last of the Northern Wars, there are different scholarly opinions on which war constitutes the First Northern War.

Depending upon what date is chosen for the starting point, the Northern Wars comprise:

The Russo-Swedish War (1554–1557), "First Northern War" according to Arvo Viljanti
The Livonian War (1558–1583), "First Northern War" according to Klaus Zernack
The Northern Seven Years' War (1563–1570), "First Northern War" according to some Polish historians
The Russo-Swedish War (1590–1595)
The Russo-Polish or Thirteen Years' War (1654–1667), "First Northern War" according to some Russian historians
The Second Northern War (1655–1660), "First Northern War" according to traditional Anglo-Saxon, German, Russian and Scandinavian historiography, in Poland known as Swedish Deluge
The Scanian War (1674–1679), also called "Swedish-Brandenburgian War" by German historians
The Great Northern War (1700–1721), also "Third Northern War" or "Second Northern War"

See also
War in the North (1937), a campaign in the Spanish Civil War
Russo-Swedish Wars
Polish–Swedish wars
Dano-Swedish War
Polish–Russian wars
Polish–Teutonic War
Early modern warfare

Sources

References

Bibliography